Lithuania participated in the Eurovision Song Contest 2002 with the song "Happy You" written and performed by Aivaras. The Lithuanian broadcaster Lithuanian National Radio and Television (LRT) organised the national final "Eurovizijos" dainų konkurso nacionalinė atranka (Eurovision Song Contest national selection) in order to select the Lithuanian entry for the 2002 contest in Tallinn, Estonia. The national final involved 15 competing entries and "We All" performed by B'Avarija was selected as the winner following the combination of votes from a jury panel, votes from the venue audience and a public vote, however the entry was later disqualified due to a Lithuanian version of the song being released on CD at the end of 2001 and replaced by runner-up "Happy You" performed by Aivaras.

Lithuania competed in the Eurovision Song Contest which took place on 25 May 2002. Performing as the closing entry during the show in position 24, Lithuania placed twenty-third out of the 24 participating countries, scoring 12 points.

Background 

Prior to the 2002 contest, Lithuania had participated in the Eurovision Song Contest three times since its first entry in 1994. The nation’s best placing in the contest was thirteenth, which it achieved in 2001 with the song "You Got Style" performed by Skamp. For the 2002 contest, the Lithuanian national broadcaster, Lithuanian National Radio and Television (LRT), broadcast the event within Lithuania and organised the selection process for the nation's entry.  Lithuania has selected their debut entry in 1994 through an internal selection, while a national final procedure selected the Lithuanian entries in 1999 and 2001. LRT confirmed their intentions to participate at the 2002 Eurovision Song Contest on 24 October 2001 and announced the organization of "Eurovizijos" dainų konkurso nacionalinė atranka, which would be the national final to select Lithuania's entry for Tallinn.

Before Eurovision

"Eurovizijos" dainų konkurso nacionalinė atranka 
"Eurovizijos" dainų konkurso nacionalinė atranka (Eurovision Song Contest national selection) was the national final format developed by LRT in order to select Lithuania's entry for the Eurovision Song Contest 2002. The competition took place on 14 February 2002 at the Palace of Sports and Culture in Vilnius, hosted by Gabija Vitkevičiūtė and Neringa Skrudupaitė and was broadcast on LTV and LTV2.

Competing entries 
LRT opened a submission period on 24 October 2001 for artists and songwriters to submit their entries with the deadline on 31 December 2001. On 8 January 2002, LRT announced the 15 entries selected for the competition from 45 submissions received. The 13-member jury panel that selected the competing entries consisted of Jonas Vilimas (LRT music producer), Nerijus Maliukevičius (Head of LRT's foreign department), Gytis Daugėla (President of the Music Culture Support Fund), Darius Užkuraitis (Lietuvos Radijas music producer), Andrius Kairaitis (Lietuvos Radijas music editor), Daiva Rinkevičiūtė (TV Antena journalist), Simona Jansonaitė (Respublika journalist), Asta Gujytė (M-1 program director), Gintaras Zdebskis (Lietus general director), Donatas Bučelis (Radiocentras program director), Algirdas Klova (composer), Gediminas Zujus (composer) and Eugenijus Butvydas (President of the Association of Lithuanian Concert Managers). On 30 January 2002, the final changes to the list of 15 competing acts were made with the disqualification of the song "Grace" performed by Aistė Pilvelytė due to it being a modification of the song "Love by Grace" by Dave Loggins and Wayne Tester. The entry was replaced with the song "Don't Ever Stop" performed by Kosmo.

Final 
The final of the competition took place on 14 February 2002 and featured the 15 competing entries. "We All" performed by B'Avarija was selected as the winner following the combination of votes from a jury panel (50%), the audience in the venue (25%) and public televoting (25%). The members of the jury consisted of Nijolė Ruzgienė (Head of Advertising and Information at the Vilnius Palace of Sports and Culture), Donatas Bučelis (Radiocentras program director), Linas Rimša (composer and producer), Daiva Rinkevičiūtė (Lietuvos rytas journalist), Žilvinas Žvagulis (singer), Neringa Čereškevičienė (composer), Gintaras Sodeika (Chairman of the Lithuanian Composers' Union), Jonas Vilimas (LRT music producer), Giedrius Puskunigis (composer), Gintaras Zdebskis (Lietus program director) and Darius Užkuraitis (Lietuvos Radijas music producer).

Replacement entry selection 
Following B'Avarija's win during the Lithuanian national final, it was reported that "We All" had broken the Eurovision Song Contest rules as the Lithuanian version of the song, "Mes čia", was released on CD at the end of 2001. On 22 March, the European Broadcasting Union (EBU) confirmed the disqualification of the song. After an unsuccessful appeal made by LRT, runner-up of the national final, "Happy You" performed by Aivaras, was announced as the new Lithuanian Eurovision entry on 27 March.

At Eurovision

The Eurovision Song Contest 2002 took place at Saku Suurhall in Tallinn, Estonia, on 25 May 2002. According to Eurovision rules, all nations with the exceptions of the bottom six countries in the 2001 contest competed in the final. On 9 November 2001, an allocation draw was held which determined the running order and Lithuania was set to close the show and perform in position 24, following the entry from Latvia.

The show was broadcast in Lithuania on LTV with commentary by Darius Užkuraitis. At the end of the event, "Happy You" finished in 23rd place with 12 points, receiving points from three of the 24 participating countries.

Voting 
Voting during the show involved each country awarding points from 1-8, 10 and 12 as determined by either 100% televoting or a combination of 50% televoting and 50% national jury. In cases where televoting was not possible, only the votes of the eight-member national juries were tabulated. The nation awarded its top 12 points to Latvia, while the highest point award it received was eight points from Latvia. The Lithuanian spokesperson, who announced the Lithuanian votes during the final, was Loreta Tarozaitė. Below is a breakdown of points awarded to Lithuania and awarded by Lithuania in the contest.

References

2002
Countries in the Eurovision Song Contest 2002
Eurovision